Bantuana is a monotypic moth genus in the family Eupterotidae described by William Lucas Distant in 1906. Its single species, Bantuana cregoei, described by the same author in the same year, is found in South Africa.

References

Endemic moths of South Africa
Moths described in 1906
Eupterotinae
Monotypic moth genera
Moths of Africa